Galkayo University (GU) was established October 2010 in Galkayo, the capital city of Mudug, Somalia, with the sole objective to contribute and develop the educational provisions of high educations necessary to the  inhabitants of Galmudug regions, its surrounding provinces and ultimately all over Somalia.

Galkayo University is administered by Mudug Foundation for Education Development (MUFED) which is set up by 55 Somali professionals in Somalia and outside Somalia (doctors, engineers, lecturers, teachers, lawyers, computer scientists, business people and other respected individuals) founded Galkayo University.

Universities in Somalia